Lasionycta sierra is a moth of the family Noctuidae. It occurs in the Sierra Nevada of California.

It is found in subalpine forests and alpine tundra and is nocturnal.

The wingspan is 32–34 mm for males and 35–36 mm for females. Adults are on wing from late July through August.

External links
A Revision of Lasionycta Aurivillius (Lepidoptera, Noctuidae) for North America and notes on Eurasian species, with descriptions of 17 new species, 6 new subspecies, a new genus, and two new species of Tricholita Grote

Lasionycta
Moths described in 2009